is a romantic soccer kid anime drawn by Noriaki Nagai. It was published by Shogakukan in CoroCoro Comic magazine from 1985 to 1989. The story is usually classified as Comedy, Drama, Shōnen and Sports. 

The manga was turned into an anime series by Studio Pierrot during 1986–1987. It ran 26 episodes and one 40 minute special, but only 23 episodes were aired in Japan. In 1988 the anime arrived to EMEA in its dubbed version and had some success in the Middle East (الهداف Al Haddaf), Iran (فوتبالیست‌ها), South Korea (내일은 축구왕), Italy (Palla al centro per Rudy), Spain (Supergol), France (But Pour Rudy), Poland (Piłkarze) and especially in Germany and Austria (Kickers). In Malaysia, the anime was aired on TV1 RTM in 1990s, Awesome TV in 2020. In Indonesia, the anime was aired on Indosiar in 1995-1997, TPI in 2003, Bali TV in 2005.

Story 

The story is about an enthusiastic kid soccer team at the Kitahara elementary school, who struggle without a competent striker, when little Kakeru Daichi's (大地翔 Daichi Kakeru) family moves into the town. He immediately applies to join the team, keen to use his skills gained in the kid team of famous soccer club "The Falcons". With Kakeru the team becomes complete in every sense and he motivates the team to challenge the "Red Devils", a strong secondary school team whose goalkeeper Uesugi is considered undefeatable. They lose 10 to 1, but Kakeru's scoring a single goal is still a small miracle. Under the strong leadership of their own goalkeeper Masaru Hongo, Kickers then enter the kid championship and fight their way up through hard won victories. Meanwhile, Hongo falls in love with Ayumi Daichi (大地歩 Daichi Ayumi), Kakeru's cute, sporty sister. In turn the striker enamours Akuna Yukie, a fragile, angelic pianist girl, who happens to be Uesugi's much younger sister. These affairs lead to some embarrassingly funny situations as well as numerous complications with the team's devoted and jealous cheerleader trio.

For a short while, Kickers gain a professional trainer whose instructions help them win their way to the semi-finals, just to meet the Red Devils once again. After a dramatic match, that spans two 20 minute episodes, Uesugi fends off Kakeru's final freescore and so the Kickers are out! The devastated team is soon divided by the arrival of Harry, a famous junior talent, who has been fired from three big name teams already for subversive behaviour. He infiltrates and splits Kickers, but his rudeness and Hongo's strong leadership re-unite the team. Harry then seduces Ayumi and assembles a faux team out of the school's scum so he can defeat the Kickers almost alone. Although the naive Kakeru is no match for the older and much stronger Harry, the Kickers's teamwork spirit and Uesugi's support secures a victory in this dirty match and Harry is devastated. The anime series ends with a redeemed Harry reconciling with the Kickers, before leaving the town to play overseas.

Crew
Original story: Noriaki Nagai
Series Director: Akira Shigino
Series Composition: Sukehiro Tomita
Script: Hiroshi Kaneko, Isao Shizutani, Mitsuo Aimono, Sukehiro Tomita
Episode Director: Akira Shigino, Harumi Tamano, Kazu Yokota, Minoru Shinbayashi, Roku Iwata, Shigeru Morikawa
Storyboard: Akira Shigino, Harumi Tamano, Kazu Yokota, Makoto Moriwaki, Minoru Shinbayashi, Roku Iwata, Shigeru Morikawa, Takayuki Kaneko
Art Director: Satoshi Miura
Art design: Masahiro Sato 
Character Design: Takeshi Ozaka
Animation Director: Takeshi Ozaka, Katsuichi Nakayama, Masami Shimoda, Mitsuo Shindo, Takafumi Hayashi
Composer: Jun Irie
Director of Photography: Hitoshi Kaneko
Editing: Masanori Sakamoto
Sound Director: Naoko Asari
Sound Effects: Kazutoshi Sato
Production manager: Reiko Fukakusa
Producer: Haruhiko Akamine (NTV), Kunitaka Okada (I&S), Takaichi Matsumoto (Pierrot)
Executive producer: Yuji Nunokawa

Voice actors
Tomiko Suzuki - Kakeru Daichi
Yuko Kobayashi - Akuna Yukie
Ikue Ohtani - Kiyoshi Hara
Kazue Ikura - Masaru Hongō
Tarako - Taichi
Michie Tomizawa - Tetsuya
Urara Takano - Mamoru
Eiko Hisamura - Hikaru Uesugi
Chieko Honda - Ayumi Daichi

Episode list

References

External links 
 Studio Pierrot official site
 Studio Pierrot official site 
 RTL II "Pokito" - official German website with full episode descriptions
 
 

1985 manga
1986 anime television series debuts
Association football in anime and manga
CoroCoro Comic
Nippon TV original programming
Pierrot (company)
Shōnen manga
Shogakukan franchises
Shogakukan manga
Winners of the Shogakukan Manga Award for children's manga